Swietenia is a genus of trees in the chinaberry family, Meliaceae. It occurs natively in the Neotropics, from southern Florida, the Caribbean, Mexico and Central America south to Bolivia. The genus is named for Dutch-Austrian physician Gerard van Swieten (1700-1772).  The wood of Swietenia trees is known as mahogany.

Overview
The genus was introduced into several Asian countries as a replacement source of mahogany timber around the time it was restricted in its native locations in the late 1990s. Trade in Asian grown plantation mahogany is not restricted. Fiji and India are the largest exporters of plantation mahogany and wild mahogany remains commercially unavailable to this day.

It is usually taken to consist of three species, geographically separated. They are medium-sized to large trees growing to 20–45 m tall, and up to  trunk diameter. The leaves are 10–30 cm long, pinnate, with 3-6 pairs of leaflets, the terminal leaflet absent; each leaflet is 5–15 cm long. The leaves are deciduous to semi-evergreen, falling shortly before the new foliage grows. The flowers are produced in loose inflorescences, each flower small, with five white to greenish-yellowish petals. The fruit is a pear-shaped five-valved capsule 8–20 cm long, containing numerous winged seeds about 5–9 cm long.

The three species are poorly defined biologically, in part because they hybridize freely when grown in proximity.

Species

Formerly placed here now in Meliaceae
 Chloroxylon swietenia DC. (as S. chloroxylon Roxb.)
 Khaya senegalensis (Desr.) A.Juss. (as S. senegalensis Desr.)
 Soymida febrifuga (Roxb.) A.Juss. (as S. febrifuga Roxb.)
 Toona sureni (Blume) Merr. (as S. sureni Blume)

Uses

The genus is famed as the supplier of mahogany, at first yielded by Swietenia mahagoni, a Caribbean species, which was so extensively used locally and exported that its trade ended by the 1950s. These days almost all mahogany is yielded by the mainland species, Swietenia macrophylla, although no longer from its native locations due to the restrictions set by CITES (see following.)

As a timber, both Swietenia macrophylla and Swietenia mahogoni are both grown in plantations in several Asian countries such as Fiji, Indonesia, India, and Bangladesh and this plantation mahogany timber is the main source of the world's current supply of "genuine mahogany", due to cultivation and trade of it in its native locations being restricted by the Convention On International Trade in Endangered Species of Wild Flora and Fauna (CITES) since the late 1990s. Trade in Swietenia grown and harvested in these non-native locations is not restricted. Species of this genus are only occasionally plantation-grown in Central America, in spite of the good growing conditions and high price of the wood, due to the ubiquitous presence of the mahogany shoot borer moth (also known as the cedar tip moth), Hypsipyla grandella, which damages the form of the tree by killing the terminal shoot, causing excessive branching. Control requires extensive and frequent spraying with pesticides, rendering the genus relatively uneconomic wherever the shoot borer is present.

The fruits of Swietenia macrophylla are called "sky fruit", because they seem to hang upwards from the tree. The "sky fruit" concentrate is sold as a natural remedy that is said to improve blood circulation and skin. It is also said to have Viagra-like qualities regarding erectile dysfunction.

A somewhat comparable wood is yielded by the related African genus Khaya. This is traded as African mahogany and is from the same family as Swietenia.

Conservation
All species of Swietenia are CITES-listed. Swietenia timber that crosses a border needs its paperwork in order. International environmental organizations such as Greenpeace, Friends of the Earth, and Rainforest Action Network have focused on Swietenia so as to expose illegal traffic in the wood, notably from Brazil.

References

 DANIDA factsheet: Swietenia humilis (pdf file)
 DANIDA factsheet: Swietenia macrophylla (pdf file)
 DANIDA factsheet: Swietenia mahagoni (pdf file)
 Floridata factsheet: Swietenia mahagoni
 Árboles de Centroamérica: Swietenia humilis (pdf Spanish)
 Árboles de Centroamérica: Swietenia macrophylla (pdf Spanish)

 
Meliaceae genera